Chodorov is a surname. Notable people with the surname include: 

Edward Chodorov (1904–1988), American playwright, screenwriter, and film producer
Frank Chodorov (1887–1966), American libertarian
Jerome Chodorov (1911–2004), American playwright and librettist

See also
Chodorow